Crassula sieberiana, the Australian stonecrop is a succulent plant found in a variety of habitats in Australia, New Zealand and Lord Howe Island. Usually seen in rock crevices. It may be found in desert areas such as Sturt National Park, or high rainfall areas near the coast including rainforest. Sub species are not recognized on New South Wales Plantnet.

References

sieberiana
Flora of New Zealand
Flora of Lord Howe Island